The Twelve Pound Look is a 1956 live television play which aired on Sydney Australia station ABN-2 (part of ABC) during the opening night of the station. Based on a British stage play by J.M. Barrie, it is significant as it was the very first drama produced for Australian TV.

The play was produced in Melbourne for the ABC the following year.

In the early days of Australian television it was common for dramas to be versions of overseas stories.

Kinescope recording existed at the time, and a copy of the play was made - it survives, albeit without sound.

Premise
Harry Sims is a wealthy businessman who is about to be knighted. He is married to Lady Sims. On the eve of the ceremony Harry engages a typist, Kate, to answer letters of congratulation. Lady Sims and Kate have a conversation, then Kate meets Harry.

It is revealed that Harry and Kate used to be married, until she abandoned him for another man. Harry demands to know why and who the man was. Kate explains that there was no other man, she needed to leave him for her own self respect.

She leaves, with Lady Sims none the wiser to her true identity.

Cast of 1956 Production

Margo Lee as Kate
Alexander Archdale as Sir Harry Sims
Joan Lord as Lady Sims

Production

The play had been performed several times on ABC radio in Australia. The television adaptation was broadcast live from the Arcon Studios in Sydney (this was before the ABC's better known studios at Gore Hill were open).

Thelma Afford did the designs. "All colour is reduced to a scale of nine grey tones," said Afford.

The play was rehearsed at a studio in Forbes St.

"We were probably all a bit nervous, but everything went very smoothly," recalls script assistant Ruth Page.

Joan Lord was later in Elizabeth Refuses and The Wraith.

The budget was £335.

Reception
Australian Women's Weekly called the 1956 version "hard to fault. Acting, direction, camera work, make-up and lighting were all excellent."

Melbourne 1957 Production

A different adaptation of the play aired in Melbourne on 1 April 1957.  It cost more than the Sydney production, the final budget being a reported £684.

It aired on ABV-2 (also part of ABC) and was also approx. 30 minutes.

Archival status of this version is unknown.

Cast
Henry Cuthbertson
Elizabeth Wing
Mary Ward
Alfred Bristowe

Production
Henry Cuthbertson was an ABC drama producer. Mary Ward had recently returned from overseas.

See also
List of live television plays broadcast on Australian Broadcasting Corporation (1950s)

References

External links

Twelve Pound Look 1956 Production at National Film and Sound Archive
Text of original play at Internet Archive
Run down of first night of ABC TV broadcasting - includes Twelve Pound Look

Australian television plays
1956 television plays
Australian Broadcasting Corporation original programming
English-language television shows
Australian live television shows
Black-and-white Australian television shows
1957 television films